Events from the year 1641 in Sweden

Incumbents
 Monarch – Christina

Events

 May - Lennart Torstensson is appointed field marshal and becomes the leader of the Swedish army during the Thirty Years' War in Germany.

Births
 20 January - Anders Torstenson, member of the Privy Council, Governor-General of Estonia (died 1686) 
 Urban Hjärne, chemist, geologist, physician and writer (died 1724) 
 Fabian Wrede, Count of Östanå, politician (died 1712) 
 Waldemar von Wrangel, soldier (died 1675) 
 Hans Wachtmeister, admiral general of the Swedish Navy and advisor to King Charles XI of Sweden and King Charles XII of Sweden (died 1714)

Deaths

 Johan Banér, Field Marshal in the Thirty Years' War (born 1596)

References

 
Years of the 17th century in Sweden
Sweden